Rockport may refer to:

Locations

Canada
Rockport, New Brunswick
Rockport, Ontario

United States
Rockport, Arkansas
Rockport, California
Rockport, Illinois
Rockport, Indiana
Rockport Generating Station
Rockport, Kentucky
Rockport, Maine
Rockport, Massachusetts, a New England town
Rockport (CDP), Massachusetts, the main village in the town
Rockport (MBTA station), a railroad station in the town
Rockport, Mississippi
Rock Port, Missouri
Rockport, Ohio
Rockport Township, a defunct township of Cuyahoga County, Ohio
Rockport, Texas
Rockport, Washington
Rockport Colony, South Dakota
Rockport Lake, a reservoir behind Wanship Dam in Utah
Rockport, Utah, a ghost town now under Rockport Lake
Rockport State Park (Washington)

Others
Rockport (company), a manufacturer of footwear
Rockport Publishers, a producer of books for the graphic design, architecture, and interior design industries
Rockport School, an independent school in County Down, Northern Ireland
Rockport, a hypothethical city of Need for Speed: Most Wanted (2005)